Kwame Opoku (born 8 May 1999) is a Ghanaian footballer who plays as a forward for Olympique Khouribga and the Ghana national team.

Club career

Asante Kotoko 
Opoku began his career at Division One League side Nkoranza Warriors, before signing for Asante Kotoko. In 2020, Asante Kotoko announced that they had signed him from Nkoranza-based club Nkoranza Warriors on a three-year contract. He scored on his Kotoko debut against Eleven Wonders on 15 November 2020 after coming on playing the full 90 minutes. The match ended in a 1–1 draw with Prince Okraku scoring Wonder's equaliser. On 22 November during his second start of the season, he scored his second goal against Berekum Chelsea, the match also ended in a 1–1 draw after Emmanuel Clottey came on in the second 75th minute to score a 96th minute late equalizer.

On 11 January 2021, he scored a first half brace to earn Kotoko a win against Liberty professionals at the Accra Sports stadium. The second goal was assisted by Brazilian footballer Fábio Gama. On 7 February 2021, Opoku scored Asante Kotoko's second goal via an assist from Emmanuel Gyamfi against then league leaders Karela United to dislodge them and move to the top of the table. He played his final match against King Faisal on 10 March 2021 after which he signed a contract with USM Alger. At the end of his one-year stint, he played 21 games and scored 8 goals, with 7 of the goals in the Ghana Premier League. At the time of his departure he was the top goal scorer for the club in the 2020–21 season.

USM Alger 
On 16 March 2021, Opoku signed a four and half years contract with USM Alger for 350,000 euro. On 8 May 2021, Opoku played his first competitive match in the League Cup in the Algiers Derby and scored a goal in the match that ended in 2–0 victory, which occurred on his 22nd birthday.

After joining them only in the second round of the season, Opoku made an immediate impact and ended his first season in Algeria with 5 goals and 4 assists in 17 matches in all competitions.

Olympique Khouribga 
On 1 February 2023, Opoku joined Moroccan side Olympique Khouribga.

International career
Opoku debuted for the Ghana national team in a 1–1 2021 Africa Cup of Nations qualification tie with South Africa on 25 March 2021.

Career statistics

Club

References

External links
 

1999 births
Living people
People from Kumasi
Association football forwards
Ghanaian footballers
Ghana international footballers
Asante Kotoko S.C. players
USM Alger players
Najran SC players
Olympique Club de Khouribga players
Ghana Premier League players
Algerian Ligue Professionnelle 1 players
Saudi First Division League players
Botola players
Ghanaian expatriate footballers
Expatriate footballers in Algeria
Ghanaian expatriate sportspeople in Algeria
Expatriate footballers in Saudi Arabia
Ghanaian expatriate sportspeople in Saudi Arabia
Expatriate footballers in Morocco
Ghanaian expatriate sportspeople in Morocco